This is a list of Sint Maartener football clubs in international competitions. Sint Maartener clubs have participated in international club competitions since at least 1956, when there was the Bonaire–Sint Maarten series. Sint Maartener clubs have participated in competitive CONCACAF football competitions since at least 2017 when Flames United entered the 2017 CFU Club Championship. To date this is the only time a Sint Maartener team has participated in a CONCACAF competition. 

No Sint Maartener team has won any CONCACAF competition, or won a single game in the competition, and Sint Maartener clubs have infrequently participated in CONCACAF tournaments due to logistical issues.

Who qualifies for CONCACAF competitions 
Since 2018, the winner of the SMSA Senior League, the top tier of football on the island qualifies for the Caribbean Club Shield, a tertiary knockout tournament for developing Caribbean football nations. This competition is held in the spring. This also serves as a qualifying for the CONCACAF League, which played tha fall. The CONCACAF League is the secondary association football competition for club football in North America. Should a team finish in the top six standings of the CONCACAF League, they qualify for the CONCACAF Champions League, which is played the following winter.

In order for a Sint Maartener team to reach the Champions League, they would need to win the Caribbean Club Shield and then earn a top six finish in the CONCACAF League.

Results by competition

CFU Club Championship

CFU Club Shield

Division Excellence 
The Division Excellence was a series between clubs in Sint Maarten, Saint-Martin, the northern French territory half of the island, and the nearby island of Saint-Barthélemy.

Bonaire Tour

Statia Tour

Appearances in CONCACAF competitions

References

External links 
 RSSSF International Club Results for North America
 Sint Maarten - List of Champions, RSSSF.com

 
North American football clubs in international competitions